Old Acquaintance may refer to:
 Old Acquaintance, a 1943 film drama
 Old Acquaintance, an album by Conte Candoli
"Old Acquaintance" (BoJack Horseman), an episode of BoJack Horseman